Central YMCA College was a college operated by the YMCA in Chicago, Illinois, United States. It was founded prior to or in 1922. and was accredited in 1924. It was closed in 1945 after the university president and a large majority of the faculty and students left to form what became Roosevelt University.

Central YMCA Community College opened in the fall of 1961 and operated until June 1982. It was sometimes called Central YMCA College for short, but had no formal connection to the earlier institution.

Closing of the school
In 1945, Edward J. Sparling, then president of the College, refused to provide the Central YMCA College board with the demographic data of his student body. He feared it would provide the basis for a quota system to limit the numerous blacks, Jews, immigrants, and women enrolled at the school. When Sparling was fired, most of the faculty and students left with him; they voted to start a new college with a vote of 62 to 1 for faculty and 488 to 2 with the student body.

This College was originally called Thomas Jefferson College. After the death of President Franklin D. Roosevelt, the college was renamed in his honor. It later achieved university status. In August 1945, Central YMCA college closed down.

Presidents
Edward J. Sparling (September 1936-April 14, 1945)

1944 racial and religious counts
In November 1944, of the approximately 2500 students at Central YMCA College, ethnic and religious minorities included the following:
625 Negroes (25.4%)
Approximately 800 Jews
96 Japanese
Approximately 400 Catholics

Student activities
The College did not offer student athletics due to racial discrimination, as there were restrictions on Negro usage of YMCA athletic facilities.

The school newspaper was the Central YMCA College Central News.

Central YMCA Community College
Central YMCA Community College, which is sometimes called Central YMCA College, was founded in Fall of 1961. It closed in June 1982.

References

External links
Interviews with Edward J. Sparling, first President of Roosevelt University, 1945-1963
Oral History interview of Edmund J. Starling Edward J. Sparling, President Emeritus of Roosevelt University discusses work experiences, and Roosevelt's connection to the Labor Movement.

Defunct private universities and colleges in Illinois
Educational institutions disestablished in 1945
Universities and colleges founded by the YMCA
Universities and colleges in Chicago